Ducktails may refer to:

the tails of ducks
Ducktails (musical project), an American indie music project
Ducktails (album), its self-titled debut studio album
Duck's ass, or ducktail, a haircut style popular during the 1950s
an incorrect name for Disney's DuckTales